James McLachlan Turnbull (born 23 May 1882) was a Scottish footballer who played as a forward, most notably for Manchester United, with whom he won the Football League and the FA Charity Shield in 1908 and the FA Cup in 1909. He was the first player to net a hat-trick in a Charity Shield game.

Club career
Turnbull played for Scottish clubs East Stirlingshire, Dundee, Falkirk and Rangers, before moving to England to sign for Preston North End and later the now dissolved Leyton.

In May 1907 he was bought by Manchester United, where he won the 1907–08 Football League title, the 1908 FA Charity Shield and the 1908–09 FA Cup. He scored a total of 45 goals in 78 games for the club, with his best season being 1908–09, in which he scored 22 times in 28 appearances in all competitions. He was sold to Bradford Park Avenue in September 1910, and later played for Chelsea.

He played in the annual Home Scots v Anglo-Scots international trial match in 1911, but did not receive any other representative honours.

Personal life
His elder brother Tom Turnbull was also a footballer who played as a defender, also featuring for Stenhousemuir, East Stirlingshire and Falkirk as well as Celtic and Sheffield United, but suffered a serious injury soon after joining the English club. Another brother, Alex, was one of Falkirk's early goalkeepers before emigrating to Canada.

Honours
Manchester United
Football League First Division: 1907–08
FA Cup: 1908–09
FA Community Shield: 1908

References

1882 births
Scottish footballers
Stenhousemuir F.C. players
East Stirlingshire F.C. players
Dundee F.C. players
Falkirk F.C. players
Rangers F.C. players
Chelsea F.C. players
Bradford (Park Avenue) A.F.C. players
Leyton F.C. players
Preston North End F.C. players
Manchester United F.C. players
Year of death missing
Association football forwards
English Football League players
Scottish Football League players
Footballers from Stirling (council area)